Kerpenyes is the Hungarian name for two villages in Romania:

 Cărpiniş village, Gârbova Commune, Alba County
 Cărpiniş village, Tărlungeni Commune, Braşov County